The Rivière Rouge (English: Red River) is a tributary of the Ouareau River, flowing in the administrative region of Lanaudière, in the province of Quebec, in Canada.

 MRC de Matawinie: municipalities of Chertsey, Saint-Alphonse-Rodriguez and Rawdon;
 MRC de Montcalm: Saint-Liguori;
 MRC of Joliette Regional County Municipality: municipalities of Saint-Ambroise-de-Kildare and Crabtree.

The course of the river passes on the south side of the village of Rawdon.

Forestry s the main economic activity in the upper part of the valley, but there is also agriculture in the middle and the lower parts except in the villages.

Geography
The Red River takes its source at the mouth of Couture Lake, taking the shape of a mushroom and located in the north-eastern part of Chertsey.

Upper course of Rouge River (segment of )

  towards the south-east, up to the limit of Saint-Alphonse-Rodriguez;
  north in Saint-Alphonse-Rodriguez, to the outlet of Lac Gareau (coming from the north);
  towards the northeast, to the northern end of Lac Gareau;
  towards the south, successively crossing Lac Joly, Lac de la Fromantière and Lake Dontigny, to the dam to the south of the latter;
  south to the outlet of Morgan Lake (coming from the west);
  towards the south-east, along the limit between Saint-Alphonse-Rodriguez and Chertsey, to the outlet of lac Marchand (coming from the east);
  south into Chertsey, to the forest road bridge;
  southward, to the north shore of Rawdon lake;
  towards the south, crossing Rawdon lake over its full length, up to at the dam at its mouth. Note: Rawdon lake follows the shape of the letter L, the foot of which is oriented towards the east; this lake is located in the village of Rawdon;

Intermediate course of the Rouge River (segment of )

From the mouth of Rawdon Lake, the Rouge River flows over:

  east passing north of the village, forming a hook south, then a large S, to the route 348 (Kildare Road);

The Red River empties on the north bank of the Ouareau river which descends towards the southeast to the north bank of the L'Assomption River. This confluence is located at:

  northwest of the St. Lawrence River;
  north of the Crabtree bridge spanning the Ouareau river;
  southeast of downtown Joliette.

Toponymy
The toponym Rivière Rouge was made official on December 5, 1968 at the Commission de toponymie du Québec.

See also
 Matawinie Regional County Municipality

References

Rivers of Lanaudière